Anthene lindae, the Linda's hairtail, is a butterfly of the family Lycaenidae. It is found in South Africa, where it is only known from a few localities in the Northern Cape.

The wingspan is about 19 mm for males and about 22 mm for females. Adults are on wing from September to December. There is one generation per year.

The larvae possibly feed on Acacia erioloba species.

References

Butterflies described in 1994
Anthene
Endemic butterflies of South Africa